A Place in the Sun is the second studio album by the American rock band Lit.

Release
Produced by Don Gilmore, the album was released on February 23, 1999 by Dirty Martini and RCA Records. It was the band's first release through a major label. The song "No Big Thing", which originally appeared on their previous album Tripping the Light Fantastic, was re-recorded for this album, and eventually appeared on the auto racing video game Jarrett & Labonte Stock Car Racing.

On December 9, 2013, the band announced on its Facebook page that it would perform a special 15th anniversary show for A Place in the Sun, when the band would play the entire album from start to finish on February 28, 2014, at the House of Blues in Anaheim, California.

Reception and legacy

The album peaked at #31 on the US Billboard 200, Singles from the album were "My Own Worst Enemy", which reached #1 on Billboard'''s Modern Rock Tracks chart for eleven weeks, "Zip-Lock" and "Miserable". A Place in the Sun has been certified platinum by in sales by the RIAA, in the United States.A Place in the Sun received mixed reviews. Leslie Matthew in AllMusic described it as "an album that is sonically more focused, but it also unfortunately makes the band sound like replicas of a dozen of their post-grunge contemporaries: neither Better Than Ezra or Less Than Jake". At NME, the songs "My Own Worst Enemy" and "No Big Thing" were described as having "a hook as sharp and persistent as a leech". It went on to say, "Gonzoid trash fun maybe, but how we got from The Dead Kennedys to here remains a mystery." NME listed the album as one of "20 Pop Punk Albums Which Will Make You Nostalgic".

The album was a massive influence on Eve 6's Horrorscope (2000), Good Charlotte's Good Charlotte (2000), American Hi-Fi's American Hi-Fi (2001), The All-American Rejects' Move Along (2005) and Zebrahead's Broadcast to the World'' (2006).

Track listing

B-sides
 "Bitter"
 "Money"
 "Down” (acoustic)
 "Snowblind"

Personnel

Lit
 A. Jay Popoff – lead vocals
 Jeremy Popoff – guitar, Moog synthesizer, backing vocals
 Kevin Baldes – bass
 Allen Shellenberger – drums

Additional musicians
 Don Gilmore – backing vocals, handclaps on "Lovely Day"
 Michael "Elvis" Baskette – handclaps 
 Larry Williams – saxophone 
 Reggie C. Young – trombone 
 Gary Grant – trumpet 
 Jerry Hey – trombone 
 Niels Bye Nielsen – Mellotron 

Management
Ruta E. Sepetys – management

Production
Don Gilmore – producer, engineer at NRG Studios
Bruce Flohr, Ron Fair – A&R direction 
Patty McGuire – A&R relations
Matt Griffin – assistant engineer
Daniel Mendez – editing, engineer
Michael "Elvis" Baskette, Cameron Webb – assistant engineers
George Marino – mastering at Sterling Sound
Brian Malouf – mixing at Pacifique
Brian Young – mixing assistant

Artwork
Brett Kilroe – art direction
Kalynn Campbell – illustration
Jon Gipe – band photography
Dennis Hallinan – cover photography

Charts

Weekly charts

Year-end charts

Singles

Certifications

References
 Citations

Sources

 

Lit (band) albums
1999 albums
RCA Records albums

it:A Place in the Sun#Musica